Paul de Saint-Léger was a French equestrian. He competed in the equestrian mail coach event at the 1900 Summer Olympics.

References

External links

Year of birth missing
Year of death missing
French male equestrians
Olympic equestrians of France
Equestrians at the 1900 Summer Olympics
Place of birth missing
Place of death missing